Empis eversmanni is a species of fly in the family Empididae.  It is included in the subgenus Polyblepharis. It is found in the Palearctic.

References

Empis
Asilomorph flies of Europe
Insects described in 1873